My Neighbor, My Killer is a 2009 French-American documentary film directed by Anne Aghion that focuses on the process of the Gacaca courts, a citizen-based justice system that was put into place in Rwanda after the 1994 genocide. Filmed over ten years, it makes us reflect on how people can live together after such a traumatic experience. Through the story and the words of the inhabitants of a small rural community, we see survivors and killers learn how to coexist.

Critical reception and awards
It was an Official Selection at the 2009 Cannes Film Festival, the winner of the Human Rights Watch's Nestor Almendros Prize for courage in filmmaking, a nominee for the 2009 Gotham Best Documentary Award and the winner of the best documentary at Montreal Black Festival. The film has been shown at film festivals and universities around the world, including in Rwanda. It is rated 100% on Rotten Tomatoes.

My Neighbor, My Killer is the feature length based on the Gacaca Series, composed of three films that Anne Aghion made over the years in Rwanda, one of which - "In Rwanda We Say…The Family That Does Not Speak Dies" - received an Emmy Award.

Festivals 

 Human Rights Watch Film Festival 
 Cannes Film Festival, 2009 
 San Francisco International Film Festival, 2009 
 Vancouver International Film Festival, 2009 
 Chicago International Film Festival, 2009 
 Honorable Mention: One Future Prize, Munich Film Festival, 2009 
 Fribourg International Film Festival, 2020 
 Nominee: Best Documentary, Gotham Awards, 2009

References

External links
 Official site
 

2009 films
French documentary films
American documentary films
Films directed by Anne Aghion
American independent films
Documentary films about the Rwandan genocide
2009 documentary films
French independent films
2009 independent films
2000s English-language films
2000s American films
2000s French films